Voëlklip, Western Cape is a settlement, a suburb of Hermanus, in Overberg District Municipality in the Western Cape province of South Africa.

References

Populated places in the Overstrand Local Municipality